The 1994 Züri-Metzgete was the 79th edition of the Züri-Metzgete road cycling one day race. It was held on 20 August 1994 as part of the 1994 UCI Road World Cup. The race took place between the cities of Basel and Zürich was won by Gianluca Bortolami of Italy.

Result

References 

Züri-Metzgete
Züri-Metzgete
Züri-Metzgete